Nanotopography refers to specific surface features which form or are generated at the nanoscopic scale.  While the term can be used to describe a broad range of applications ranging from integrated circuits to microfluidics, in practice it typically applied to sub-micron textured surfaces as used in biomaterials research.

In nature 

Several functional nanotopographies have been identified in nature.  Certain surfaces like that of the  lotus leaf  have been understood to apply nanoscale textures for abiotic processes such as self-cleaning.  Bio-mimetic applications of this discovery have since arrived in consumer products.  In 2012, it was recognized that nanotopographies in nature are also used for antibiotic purposes.  The wing of the cicada, the surface of which is covered in nanoscale pillars, induces lysis of bacteria.  While the nano-pillars were not observed to prevent cell adhesion, they acted mechanistically to stretch microbial membranes to breakage.  In vitro testing of the cicada wing demonstrated its efficacy against a variety of bacterial strains.

Manufacturing 
Numerous technologies are available for the production of nanotopography.  High-throughput techniques include plasma functionalization, abrasive blasting, and etching.  Though low cost, these processes are limited in the control and replicability of feature size and geometry.  Techniques enabling greater feature precision exist, among them electron beam lithography and particle deposition, but are slower and more resource intensive by comparison.  Alternatively, processes such as molecular self-assembly can be utilized which provide an enhanced level of production speed and feature control.

Applications to medicine 

Though the effects of nanotopography on cell behavior have only been recognized since 1964, some of the first practical applications of the technology are being realized in the field of medicine.  Among the few clinical applications is the functionalization of titanium implant surfaces with nanotopography, generated with submersion etching and sand blasting.  This technology has been the focal point of a diverse body of research aimed at improving post-operative integration of certain implant components.  The determinant of integration varies, but as most titanium implants are orthopedics-oriented, osseointegration is the dominant aim of the field.

Applications to cell engineering 
Nanotopography is readily applied to cell culture and has been shown to have a significant impact on cell behavior across different lineages. Substrate features in the nanoscale regime down to the order of 9 nm are able to retain some effect.  Subjected solely to topographical cues, a wide variety of cells demonstrate responses including changes in cell growth and gene expression.  Certain patterns are able to induce stem cells to differentiate down specific pathways.
Notable results include osteogenic induction in the absence of media components as well as near-total cell alignment as seen in smooth muscle.  The potential of topographical cues to fulfill roles otherwise requiring xeno-based media components offers high translatability to clinical applications, as regulation and cost related to animal-derived products constitutes a major roadblock in a number of cell-related technologies.

References 

Nanotechnology
Biomaterials